Appanoose Township may refer to the following townships in the United States:

 Appanoose Township, Hancock County, Illinois
 Appanoose Township, Franklin County, Kansas